Boopedon gracile, known generally as the prairie boopie or graceful range grasshopper, is a species of slant-faced grasshopper in the family Acrididae. It is found in Central America and North America.

References

Further reading

 

Gomphocerinae
Articles created by Qbugbot
Insects described in 1904